Richard Iwai (born 15 March 1979, Vanuatu) is a former Vanuatuan international footballer who played most of his career for Tafea as a forward. He's currently assistant coach of Ifira Black Bird and the head coach of the Vanuatu under-23 team.

Career

Club career
Iwai began his career in Vanuatu with Tafea. Also he played in Fiji for Suva and in Australia for Mitchelton. In 2008, he return to Tafea.

International career
Iwai has played at international level for Vanuatu.

International goals

Scores and results list Vanuatu's goal tally first, score column indicates score after each Vanuatu goal.

External links

1979 births
Living people
Vanuatuan footballers
Vanuatu international footballers
Vanuatuan expatriate footballers
Suva F.C. players
Tafea F.C. players
2000 OFC Nations Cup players
2002 OFC Nations Cup players
2004 OFC Nations Cup players
2008 OFC Nations Cup players
Association football forwards
Expatriate soccer players in Australia
Expatriate footballers in Fiji
Vanuatuan expatriate sportspeople in Australia
Vanuatuan expatriate sportspeople in Fiji